The Broken Bow Carnegie Library is a historic building in Broken Bow, Nebraska. It was built by Clyde Elder in 1915-1916 as a Carnegie library thanks to a $10,000 donation from the Carnegie Corporation of New York, and designed by M.N. Bair. It was dedicated on March 25, 1916, and it remained the public library in Broken Bow until 1972. It has been listed on the National Register of Historic Places since March 5, 1998.

References

Carnegie libraries in Nebraska
Library buildings completed in 1916
Libraries on the National Register of Historic Places in Nebraska
National Register of Historic Places in Custer County, Nebraska
1916 establishments in Nebraska